A robber frog is a frog in the family Craugastoridae.

Robber frog may also refer to:

 Anatipes robber frog, a frog found in Colombia and Ecuador
 Black-banded robber frog, a frog found in Colombia, Ecuador, Peru, and possibly Brazil
 Boqueron robber frog, a frog endemic to Colombia
 Caceres robber frog, a frog found in Brazil and Bolivia
 Cachabi robber frog, a frog found from Panama to Ecuador
 Clay robber frog, a frog endemic to Brazil
 Cuyuja robber frog, a frog found in Colombia and Ecuador
 Danubio robber frog, a frog endemic to Colombia
 False green robber frog, a frog endemic to Haiti
 Fitzinger's robber frog, a frog found in Colombia, Costa Rica, Honduras, Nicaragua, and Panama
 Gunther's robber frog, a frog endemic to Mexico
 Inger's robber frog, a frog found in Colombia and possibly Venezuela
 Karl's robber frog, a frog that is possibly extinct
 La Paz robber frog, a frog found in Bolivia, Peru, and possibly Brazil
 Lancini's robber frog, a frog endemic to Venezuela
 Mantipus robber frog, a frog endemic to Colombia
 Marbled robber frog, a frog found in Brazil, French Guiana, Guyana, Suriname, Venezuela, possibly Colombia, and possibly Peru
 Mindo robber frog, a frog found in Ecuador and possibly Colombia
 Montane robber frog, a critically endangered amphibian
 Narino robber frog, a frog found in Colombia and Ecuador
 Nauta robber frog, a frog found in Brazil, Colombia, Ecuador, and Peru
 Palma Real robber frog, a frog found in Colombia and Ecuador
 Papallacta robber frog, a frog endemic to Ecuador
 Paramo robber frog, a frog endemic to Venezuela
 Paulo's robber frog, a frog endemic to Brazil
 Peters' robber frog, a frog found in Colombia and Ecuador
 Puerto Cabello robber frog, a frog endemic to Venezuela
 Putumayo robber frog, a frog found in Colombia and Ecuador
 Rio Pitzara robber frog, a frog endemic to Ecuador
 Rio Suno robber frog, a frog found in Colombia and Ecuador
 Ruiz's robber frog, a frog endemic to Colombia
 Striped robber frog, a frog found in Colombia and Ecuador
 Tucuman robber frog, a frog found in Argentina and Bolivia

See also

 Rubber frog

Animal common name disambiguation pages